Government House  is the official residence of the governor-general of Saint Lucia. It is also the official residence of the head of state of Saint Lucia (currently King Charles III) when staying in Saint Lucia. The house is located on the crest of Morne Fortune, near Castries.

The first Government House that was built on this site was destroyed by a hurricane in 1817, before its completion. A second house, built of timber, was completed on the same spot in 1819. This house fell into disrepair, and was abandoned by 1865. Government House then relocated to a nearby disused military barracks.

Construction of the present brick-built Government House was started on the site of the previous house in 1894, and was completed a year later.  It was originally used as the home and office of the Commissioners of Saint Lucia until 1958, then for the Administratiors of the island. From 1967, Government House was used by the Governors of Saint Lucia, and since Saint Lucia became an independent state in 1979 it has been used by Governors-General.

At the 2015 United Nations Climate Change Conference, the Government of St Lucia officially announced it would be installing solar panels on the building in partnership with non-profit Solar Head of State, in order to send a message on the importance of renewable energy.

See also
Government Houses of the British Empire and Commonwealth
Governor-General of Saint Lucia

References

External links
 

Official residences
Government buildings in Saint Lucia
Government of Saint Lucia
Government Houses of the British Empire and Commonwealth
Government buildings completed in 1895
Houses completed in 1895
Saint Lucia–United Kingdom relations
1895 establishments in the British Empire